The Dhola Maru is the romantic tale of Dhola and Maru in Rajasthan. The Rajasthani version is entirely different from a version found in Chhattisgarh.

Literature

The Dhola Maru story is deeply rooted in folklore and oral traditions. The story related work is available in prose and poetry as well as in mixed form also. 'Dhola Maru ri chaupai' a book composed by Jain monk Kushallabh in 1617, in which he writes that the story is old one, some manuscripts in 1473 also describes about the story. 'Dhola Maru ra doha' is the edited text by Kashi nagari Pracharini sabha. The tale depicts one of the most mesmerizing chapters of Rajput and rajasthani history.

Story
Rajasthani Version:

This is a love story of Kachhwaha prince Dhola of Narwar and Poogal princess Maru. The couple is married in their childhood. Later the father of Dhola, the king Nal, died and Dhola forgot the marriage and got married again to Malwani. Maru sent many messages to Dhola, but all were destroyed by Malwani.then she came with a plan to reach Dhola and sent her messages that she is her first wife who has child marriage with her ( illegal now) and now I have changed my mind , I wanted to be independent. She want to stand on her and wanted to do something for her people .so I wanted to end this relationship that ' s why I want to meet you but I think somebody block my messages intentionally.

A group of folk singers from Poogal visited the Narwar and told Dhola about his first wife Maru. Dhola made a perilous journey and faced many obstacles, and his wife Malwani also tried to stop him from going. He arrived at Poogal and Dhola and Maru were united at last.

In return journey, Maru is bitten by a snake and in sorrow Dhola decides to burn himself as 'male sati'. But he was save by a yogi and yogini who claimed that they could bring Maru back to life. They played their musical instruments and brought back Maru to life. Umar Sumar again tried to kill Dhola, but however they escaped from there riding back on the wonderful flying camel and the couple along with Malwani lived happily ever after.

Chhattisgarhi Version:

In Chhattisgarh version, Dhola is the son of king Nal and mother Damyanti. Dhola in his previous birth is one very beautiful young man who was catching fish in the village pond through angle called 'gari' in Chhattisgarhi. Rewa, an exceptionally beautiful woman, who was daughter-in-law of some family in the village in her previous birth, came to fetch water seven times, expecting Dhola at least to say a word to her. However, when getting no response from Dhola, she broke her silent by reciting following verse which rhymes:

Dhola replied:

This reply pierced Rewa's heart like an arrow and filled it with ocean of remorse. Struck by heart-pinching reply, and rejection, she returned to her home and committed suicide by jumping into the well in her family garden called kola in Chhattisgarhi. When her soul reaches heaven, she is confronted by God there as to how come she returned to heaven before completing her actual duration of life-span. She narrates her story of being rejected by Dhola. So God asked her what she wanted. Rewa replied that she wanted Dhola to be her husband. In reply to her request, God said that Dhola is already destined to be husband of Maaru, and thus Rewa cannot have Dhola as her husband for the life-time but only for 12 years. And the story turns to after-birth of Dhola, Maaru and Rewa, where Dhola and Maaru are married in the childhood.

Mother Damyanti keeps warning her son Dhola that he can go to roam around every para (caste-based locality) of the village except Malhin para (Malhin is the caste which sell flower and their main profession is gardening). However, Dhola does not listen to her and goes to roam around Malhin para and is there confronted by a parrot who challenges him by saying:

Dhola could not stop his anger, and using his catapult, hit the parrot. The parrot dies immediately and to his surprise appeared an exceptionally beautiful lady who owned this parrot. This lady was Rewa and the parrot was creation of her magic. She insisted that her parrot be made alive again otherwise Dhola has to live with her at her home. Rewa's father, Hiriya Malhin, and others in the village tried to convince her to let go the matter, but it was of no accord. Dhola is lovingly imprisoned at Rewa's house and started living as her Mister.

Meanwhile, Maaru reaches her age of youth and started missing Dhola. She sends various messages to Dhola through parrot and later through Dharhee (probably a human messenger). But both of these messengers were intercepted by Rewa through her Chhachhand (Eagle) and by other means. Finally, Maaru sends the Karhaa (a camel given to her by her parents as wedding gift). Karhaa managed to reach the village of Rewa, but was struck to sickness through magic of Rewa and lives in swamp area for twelve years and thirteen Poornimas (fortnights).

Maaru's geeyan [formal female friend] is married to one businessman (Baniya) in the town of Narour (most likely present day Nandour-Kalan near Sakti, National Highway 200, Jangir-Champa District, Chhattisgarh) where Dhola lives with Rewa. She had recently visited her maayka (maternal home) at Pingla (most likely one of suburb of then Malhar garh which is near Mulmula, National Highway 200, Bilaspur District, Chhattisgarh about 70 km from Narour) and met her friend Maaru who had given her a love-letter to be delivered to Dhola. Maaru had requested that this letter should not be read by anyone else except Dhola as this has some very personal details which she wanted to share only with Dhola. On the eve of Vijay Dashmi (i.e. Navami before Dussehra), this friend of Maaru was combing her long hairs and watching out through the window. The Baniya was making some accounting report sitting nearby. The lady hears a weeping-sound in the midst of the drum-sound of Navami Dussehra celebrations. She asks her husband as to who are those people who might be weeping amidst celebration. Her husband replies that those people are king Nal and his wife Damyanti, who in their old age are wondering as to who will roam through city streets on chariot and receive the johar (greetings) on the behalf king from the citizens of Narour city as their only son Dhola is under house arrest at Rewa's palace. She immediately remembers of the letter that Maaru had given and requests her husband to deliver it to Dhola. But Dhola Kuwar is never allowed to go out. However, as the 12 years with Rewa are about to end; Dhola too feels a sense of uneasiness within and resolves to go out to receive the Johar. After multiple requests, Rewa gives in and agrees for Dhola's visit outside her home but puts a condition that she will also accompany him in khadkhadiya chariot (small chariot tied behind to a bigger chariot). Dhola convinces her that by seeing Rewa behind his chariot, everyone in the village will laugh at him and make jibes about his manhood and kingly authority. So finally Rewa agrees to stay at home and Dhola Kuwar is allowed to go out to receive johar on the occasion of Dussehra. Baniya was just looking for this opportunity to meet Dhola Kuwar somehow.

And the story continues ..........

Folk theatre

In Rajasthani folk theatre popularity of Dhola-Maru tradition is very much. The folk theatre of Rajasthan 'Khyal' belongs to one of the least researched areas of the arts in this region.

In popular culture 
The folktale has been adapted into the Indian films: Dhola Maru (1956) by N. R. Acharya, Dhola Maru (1983) by Mehul Kumar.

References

Indian folklore
Love stories
Rajasthani literature
1617 books
Rajasthani folklore
Indian literature
17th-century Indian books